The Auspicious Incident (or Event) (Ottoman Turkish: Vaka-i Hayriye, "Fortunate Event" in Constantinople; Vaka-i Şerriyye, "Unfortunate Incident" in the Balkans) was the forced disbandment of the centuries-old Janissary corps by Sultan Mahmud II on 15 June 1826. Most of the 135,000 Janissaries revolted against Mahmud II, and after the rebellion was suppressed, most of them were executed, exiled or imprisoned. The disbanded Janissary corps was replaced with a more modern military force.

Background
The Janissaries were first created by the Ottoman Sultans in the late 14th century and were employed as household troops. Janissaries began as an elite corps made up through the devşirme system of child slavery, by which young Christian boys, notably Serbs, Albanians, Bosnians, Bulgarians, Croats, Greeks, Macedonians, Slovenians, and Romanians were taken from the Balkans, forcibly circumcised, converted to Islam, and incorporated into the Ottoman army. During the 15th and 16th centuries they were recognized as one of the best-trained and most effective military units in Europe. They became known for their discipline, morale and professionalism. They were paid regularly and were expected to be ready to enter battle at any time. By the 16th century, Janissaries were also recruited from ethnic Turks.

However, by the early 17th century, the Janissary corps had ceased to function as an elite military force, and had become a privileged hereditary class, and their exemption from paying taxes made them highly unfavorable in the eyes of the rest of the population. The number of Janissaries grew from 20,000 in 1575 to 135,000 in 1826, about 250 years later. Many were not soldiers but still collected pay from the empire, as dictated by the corps since it held an effective veto over the state and contributed to the steady decline of the Ottoman Empire. Any sultan who tried to diminish its status or power was immediately either killed or deposed.

As opportunities and power continued to rise within the Janissary corps, it began to undermine the empire. Over time it became clear that for the empire to restore its position as a major power of Europe, it needed to replace the Janissary corps with a modern army.

Mutiny
When Mahmud II began forming a new army and hiring European gunners, the Janissaries mutinied and fought on the streets of the Ottoman capital, but the militarily superior Sipahis charged and forced them back into their barracks. Turkish historians claim that the counter-Janissary force, which was great in numbers, included the local residents who had hated the Janissaries for years.

Historians suggest that Mahmud II purposely incited the revolt and have described it as the sultan's "coup against the Janissaries". The sultan informed them that he was forming a new army, the Sekban-ı Cedit, organized and trained along modern European lines (and that the new army would be Turkish-dominated). The Janissaries saw their institution as crucial to the well-being of the Ottoman Empire, especially to Rumelia, and had previously decided they would never allow its dissolution. Thus, as predicted, they mutinied, advancing on the sultan's palace. Mahmud II then brought out the Holy Banner of the Prophet Muhammad from inside the Sacred Trust, intending all true believers to gather beneath it and thus bolster opposition to the Janissaries. In the ensuing fight the Janissary barracks were set ablaze by artillery fire, resulting in 4,000 Janissary deaths; more were killed in the heavy fighting on the streets of Constantinople (the capital of the Ottoman Empire and the center of the Janissary order). The survivors either fled or were imprisoned, their possessions confiscated by the Sultan. By the end of 1826 the captured Janissaries, constituting the remainder of the force, were put to death by decapitation in the Thessaloniki fort that soon came to be called the "Blood Tower" (but which has been known since 1912 as the White Tower). Roughly 100 other Janissaries fled to the Cistern of Philoxenos where many drowned.

Aftermath
The Janissary leaders were executed and their possessions confiscated by the Sultan. The younger Janissaries were either exiled or imprisoned. Thousands of Janissaries had been killed, and thus the elite order came to its end. The Sufi Order of the Bektaşi Brotherhood, a core Janissary institution, was outlawed, and its followers executed or exiled. A new modern corps, Asakir-i Mansure-i Muhammediye ("The Victorious Soldiers of Muhammad") was established by Mahmud II to guard the Sultan and replace the Janissaries. Many ordinary Janissaries, especially in the provinces, began rogue revolts and demanded autonomy. Christians in the Balkans became very hostile to their Muslim neighbors and began to rally against the new Turkish armies sent from Constantinople. Some Janissaries survived by keeping a low profile and taking ordinary jobs.

Immediately after the Janissaries had been disbanded, Mahmud II ordered the court chronicler, Mehmet Esad Efendi, to record the official version of events. This account, Üss-i Zafer ("Foundation of Victory"), was printed in Istanbul in 1828 and served as the main source for every other Ottoman account of this period. The incident had a negative impact on the Muslim communities in the Balkans, who lost their privileges, as rebellions broke out across Rumelia, especially in Bosnia and Albania.

Taking advantage of the temporary weakness in the military position of the Ottoman Empire following the Auspicious Incident, the Russian Empire forced the Ottomans to accept the Akkerman Convention on 7 October 1826.

See also
 Selim III
 Sanjak of Smederevo
 First Serbian Uprising
 Mustafa IV
 Halet Efendi
 Hursid Pasha
 Reşid Mehmed Pasha  
 Muhammad Ali's seizure of power  
 Ottoman military reform efforts
 Ali Pasha of Janina
 Mustafa Reshiti
 Husein Gradaščević
 Devşirme

Notes

References
 Goodwin, Jason (1998). Lords of the Horizons: A History of the Ottoman Empire. New York: H. Holt 
 Kinross, Patrick (1977) The Ottoman Centuries: The Rise and Fall of the Turkish Empire London: Perennial. 
 Shaw, Stanford J. & Shaw, Ezel Kural (1977). History of the Ottoman Empire and Modern Turkey (Vol. II). New York: Cambridge University Press. 

Politics of the Ottoman Empire
1826 in the Ottoman Empire
Reform in the Ottoman Empire
June 1826 events
1826 in military history
Mahmud II